Xihu is a town in Hanjiang District, Yangzhou, Jiangsu, China. , it administers the following four residential communities and seven villages.
Xifeng Community
Cuigang Community
Xihuhuayuan Community
Runyang Community
Jingwei Village
Situ Village
Jinhuai Village
Zhongxin Village
Yuqiao Village
Shugang Village
Huchang Village

References

Township-level divisions of Jiangsu
Hanjiang District, Yangzhou